The Upstate Eight Conference (UEC, U8C, or Upstate 8) is an organization of ten high schools in northeastern Illinois, representing ten communities in Chicago's suburbs.  These high schools are all members of the Illinois High School Association.

The high schools of the Upstate Eight Conference are located in Kane County, Cook County, and DuPage County.  Originally, the conference had eight member schools, but over time the membership has varied from six to as many as sixteen schools without any change of name.

History

Formed in 1963 its charter members were DeKalb High School, East Aurora High School, Elgin High School, Larkin High School, Glenbard East High School, Naperville Community, West Aurora High School and Wheaton Community high schools. That next year Wheaton Community was renamed Wheaton Central when the district split.  In 1965 Glenbard East left to join the Des Plaines Valley League and was replaced by St. Charles High School. Naperville Community and Wheaton Central left in 1975 to join the newly formed DuPage Valley Conference. Lake Park High School and newly opened Streamwood High School were added in 1979, which led to a stable lineup for the next 12 years.

Waubonsie Valley High School, located in Aurora, joined in 1991. West Aurora High School left in 1997 to join the DuPage Valley Conference. Newly opened schools Bartlett High School and Neuqua Valley High School located in Naperville joined in 1998. St. Charles High School split into St. Charles East and St. Charles North in 2000, with St. Charles North joining in 2001. South Elgin High School joined upon opening in 2005, preemptively taking DeKalb's place, as they left in 2006. Batavia High School and Geneva High School joined in 2010 following the dissolution of the Western Sun Conference, and joined newly opened Metea Valley High School in Aurora to bring conference membership to 14 schools.
Lake Park left the conference to join the DuPage Valley Conference for the 2013–2014 season and was replaced by West Chicago. Glenbard East High School and West Aurora High School will return to the Upstate Eight Conference for the 2014-2015 athletic season, leaving the DuPage Valley Conference. For the 2015-2016 athletic season, Metea Valley High School, Neuqua Valley High School, and Waubonsie Valley High School leave the Upstate Eight conference for the DuPage Valley Conference. Starting in the 2018–2019 school year, St. Charles North, St. Charles East, Batavia, and Geneva will leave for the newly formed DuKane Conference along with Wheaton North, Wheaton Warrenville South, Glenbard North, and Lake Park from the DuPage Valley Conference while new member, Glenbard South High School joins in and the River and Valley Divisions became eliminated.

In 2019–2020 school year, Fenton will replace West Aurora when accepting to leave the conference for the Southwest Prairie Conference.

Membership

Former members

* Naperville Community HS split into Naperville Central HS and Naperville North HS (which had no connection with the conference) in 1970.
** School renamed Wheaton Warrenville South HS in 1992.

*** In 2000, St. Charles HS renamed St. Charles East when St. Charles North opened in 2001

Timeline

Athletes
Joaquin Vargas of Streamwood High School was the 1st place winner at the 2021/22 conference in the freshman 182lb weight class.

Sports
The conference currently oversees a total of 17 sports.  Young men and women may compete in basketball, bowling, Dance, cheerleading, cross country, chess, golf, gymnastics, soccer, swimming & diving, tennis, track & field, speech, and volleyball.  Young men may compete in baseball, football, and wrestling, while young women may compete in badminton and softball.

References

External links
 Upstate Eight Conference
 Illinois High School Association, Official Site

Illinois high school sports conferences